The politics of the Royal Borough of Greenwich.

Royal Borough of Greenwich
In 2012, Greenwich received royal status (Greenwich Park is one of the royal parks) Royal Status 
Summary of council election results:

Following boundary changes in 2022, Greenwich is administered by 55 councillors. The Labour Party currently has an overall majority on the council, holding 52 seats, with the Conservatives holding 3. Labour has had a majority on the council since 1971.

Electoral wards
From 2002 to 2022, the borough was divided into 17 wards, each electing three councillors every four years.

By-elections in 2002-2006 Council

By-elections in 2006-2010 Council

By-elections in 2014-2018 Council

By-elections in 2018-2022 Council

By-elections in 1998-2002 Council

By-elections in 1994-1998 Council

By-elections in 1990-1994 Council

By-elections in 1986-1990 Council

By-elections in 1982-1986 Council

By-elections in 1978-1982 Council

Westminster Parliament
The borough contains the constituencies of:
 Eltham
 Erith and Thamesmead (shared with the London Borough of Bexley)
 Greenwich and Woolwich

As of the 2010 General Election, all three are represented by Labour MPs.

References